Ganatra is an Indian (Lohana) surname from Gujarat. Notable people with the surname include:

Bipin Ganatra, Indian firefighter
Nisha Ganatra (born 1974), Canadian-American film director, screenwriter, producer and actress 
Nitin Ganatra (born 1968), Kenyan-born British actor
Paresh Ganatra (born 1965), Indian television, stage and film actor
Vaishnavi Ganatra, Indian actress

References

Indian surnames
Surnames of Indian origin
Gujarati-language surnames
Hindu surnames
Lohana